Rashed Uddin Ahmed Topu (born 2 June 1982) popularly known as Topu is a Bangladeshi musician, singer-songwriter and composer as well as the lead vocalist of Yaatri. In 2004 Topu formed the band "Yaatri" and began his career with a compilation album Shopnochura released in 2004. He rose to fame with the release of the single "Ek Paye Nupur". and signed with G-Series and released the first band album "Daak" in 2006. He released his first solo studio album Bondhu Bhabo Ki in 2008, followed by the huge popularity, he released four solo studio albums, Shey Ke? (2010) and Aar Tomake (2013), Dekha Hobe Boley (2015)

Life and career

1982–2004: Early life 
Topu was born on 2 June 1982 in Dhaka, Bangladesh. His father, Shamshuddin Ahmed served as a Lieutenant colonel of Bangladesh Army. He has an elder sister. Being the son of an army officer, He moved a lot around the country. He spent his childhood in the midst of hills and trees at Comilla Cantonment. Topu went to Ispahani Public School & College, Chittagong and Barisal Cadet College. He holds a bachelor's degree in Computer Science and Engineering from North South University.

Topu's enthusiasm to music began at an early age. He discovered his love for music back in high school when he started to compose and sing on his guitar. He was literally inspired to write from his surroundings. His aptitude to music grew more when his father gave an acoustic guitar as gift for his glorious result in SSC examination. He started his musical life in college, composing and writing lyrics and gave his first stage performance at Barisal Cadet College.

2005–07: Career beginnings 
While studying in North South University in 2003, Topu became a member of North South University Shangskritik Shangothon (NSUSS), one of the biggest clubs promoting culture and music in the university. In 2004, Topu and Emran met at the NSUSS, started jamming together and formed the band "Yaatri". The first line up of their band was Bipu (guitars), Mitu (bass), Emran (keys) and Topu (vocals). It was then when Tony, drummer of Black collaborated with them for their first single "Ek Paye Nupur" which was released in the compilation album Shopnochura at the end of 2004.

Yaatri was not officially formed until 2005 when Tony asked for another song in his sequel album Shopnochura II. After that they composed another single titled "Ekta Gopon Kotha" which was one of the highlights of that album, and this fame and recognition brought Khaled, owner of G-Series to offer them a record deal in November 2005. For the next eight months, both Topu and Emran worked with Buno in his studio Dhun, who mixed and mastered the album. Collaborating with other guitarists, bassists and drummers, Yaatri finished their debut album Daak in October 2006 which consists of ten compositions. It was released on 19 October on the occasion of Eid-ul-fitr. The album featuring songs Ei Ki Beshi Na, Bhalobasha Shunechi Ja, Ojana Mone, Ke Daake, Miththey Prem was a hit.

Personal life
Topu has three siblings and he is the youngest of them. He married Naziba Selim on 24 August 2012 in Dhaka. The post-wedding reception was held on 20 June 2013 at a city restaurant in Dhaka.

Discography
Band albums
 2006: Daak

Solo Studio albums
 2008: Bondhu Bhabo Ki?
 2010: She Ke?
 2013: Aar Tomake
 2015: Dekha Hobe Boley

Compilation album
 2004: Shopnochura      – (track – Ek paye Nupur)
 2005: Shopnochura II    – (track – Ekta Gopon Kotha)
 2006: Underground             – (track –  Jonmechi Tai)
 2007: Underground 2         – (track –  Chetona)
 2007: Shopnochura III     – (track –  Jonmechi Tai)
 2008: Bondhuta            – (track –  Manush Matro Bhul)
 2008: The Hit Album      – (track –  Mon Bhalo Nei)
 2008: Rock 101                  – (track –  Bodle Jai)
 2009: Rock 202                  – (track –  Keu Na Keui)
 2010: The Hit Album III        – (track –  Ei Shono)
 2012: Studio 58 & Singers     – (track -Songopone)
 2012: Oporajita            – (track -Bhubondangar Hashi)
 2012: Letters From Siliguri 2               – (track -Toke Vabi Ami aka Dekhechi Toke)
 2012: Hatiar               – (track -Na)
 2013: Nimontron               – (track -Nimontron)
 2013: The Hit Album IV        – (track – Joldighi)
 2014: Shopnochura IV   – (track -Ora Bodle Geche )
 2014: Keya Patar Nouko        – (track -Bhalo Achi, Keya Pata )

Film Soundtrack Album
 2009: Third Person Singular Number

Filmography

Film

Music videos

Other works
Book
 2010: Ekti Gopon Kotha
Topu made his debut as a writer with the book "Ekti Gopon Kotha" which was published in 2010 under Ajob Productions at the Ekushey Book Fair.  The book contains lyrics of 36 of his songs.  They are mostly romantic songs and all the lyrics are written by him.

As host
 2010:  Monbondhur Moner Deshe – (TV Program; aired on 15 September 2010)
 2010:  Monbondhur Moner Deshe  – (TV Program; aired in November 2010)
 2012: Amar Guitar Amar Gaan –  (TV Program; aired on 11 March 2012)

Awards and nominations

Meril Prothom Alo Awards 

|-
| style="text-align:center;" rowspan="1"| 2010
| style="text-align:center;" rowspan="1"| Third Person Singular Number
| style="text-align:center;"| Best Film Actor (Critics Choice )
| 
|-
|}

See also 
 Anila
 Fuad Al Muktadir

References

External links
 
 

1982 births
Living people
21st-century Bangladeshi male singers
21st-century Bangladeshi singers
Bengali-language singers
People from Dhaka
North South University alumni
Barishal Cadet College alumni